Padeh-ye Jan Morad (also Romanized as Padeh-ye Jān Morād) is a village in Qaleh Hamam Rural District, Salehabad County, Razavi Khorasan Province, Iran. At the 2006 census, its population was 426, in 86 families.

References 

Populated places in   Torbat-e Jam County